Tri-City Airport was a small privately owned airport located in San Bernardino, California just north of Interstate 10 and east of Waterman Avenue. The Tri-City Corporate Center now occupies the land where it was located.

It was owned by Pinky Brier and Joe Brier.

References

Airports in California
Buildings and structures in San Bernardino, California
Privately owned airports